The year 1699 in music involved some significant events.

Events
February – Richard Leveridge, Daniel Purcell and Jeremiah Clarke collaborate on the music for an adaptation of Fletcher's The Island Princess.
John Blow is appointed to the newly created post of Composer to the Chapel Royal in England.
Antonio Caldara appointed maestro di cappella da chiesa e del teatro to Ferdinando Carlo, the last Gonzaga Duke of Mantua.
Quirinus Blankenburg is appointed organist at the Nieuwe Kerk in The Hague (however, he only started working there in 1702 after the new organ was completed).

Classical music
Carlo Agostino Badia 
Imeneo trionfante, serenata for the wedding of Joseph I and Wilhelmine Amalie of Braunschweig-Lüneburg
Tributi armonici, 12 chamber cantatas (published circa 1699)
 Heinrich Ignaz Franz von Biber – Sonata violino solo representativa
Giovanni Battista Brevi – La devotione canora: motetti, libro II, motets for voice and basso continuo
Antonio Caldara 
Suonate da camera, op. 2; twelve trio sonatas
Cantate da camera a voce sola, op. 3; twelve cantatas
 André Campra 
 Carnaval de Venise
 Missa 'Ad majorem Dei gloriam''' 
 Motets, Livre 2 
 Michel Richard Delalande – Confitebor tibi Domine in consilio, S.56
Rocco Greco – 31 sinfonie, 10 passacaglie, 11 brani strumentaliNicolas de Grigny – Premier livre d'orgue, an organ Mass and hymn settings, comprising 42 pieces; second edition published in 1711
George Frideric Handel – Trio Sonata in G minor, HWV 387 
Johann Pachelbel – Hexachordum Apollinis, six arias with variations for keyboard
Daniel Purcell – Ode for St Cecilia's Day, the second of the three such pieces by the composer
Alessandro Scarlatti – Clori mia, Clori bella, H.129

Publications
The first issue of Mercurius Musicus: or, the Monthly Collection of New Teaching Songs, one of the earliest planned periodicals of music scores, was published in London

Opera
Antonio Caldara – L'oracolo in sognoCarlo Agostino Badia – Il NarcisoHeinrich Ignaz Franz von Biber – Trattenimento musicale del'ossequio di Salisburgo (large cantata; his last)
Francesco Gasparini – Mirena e FloroJohann Mattheson – Die PlejadesAntonio Quintavalle, Antonio Caldara, and Antonio Pollarolo – L'oracolo in sognoAlessandro Scarlatti – Gl'Inganni feliciTheoretical writingsJohan Georg Ahlens musikalisches Herbst-Gespräche by Johann Georg Ahle, on consonance and dissonance. Third part of Ahle's Musikalische Gespräche series of treatises in form of dialogues.Primi elementi di musica per li principianti by Giovanni Battista Brevi

Births
January 14 – Jakob Adlung, musician (died 1762)
February 14 – Tobias Henrich Schubart librettist for Georg Telemann (died 1747)
March 25 – Johann Adolph Hasse, composer (died 1783)
May 4 – Giacomo Francesco Milano Franco d'Aragona, composer (died 1780)
November 13 – Jan Zach, violinist, organist and composer (died 1773)
December 17 – Charles-Louis Mion, composer (died 1775)
December 23 – Joseph Gibbs, composer (died 1788)date unknown  
René de Galard de Béarn, Marquis de Brassac, soldier and amateur composer (died 1771)
Johann Friedrich Ruhe, composer (died 1776)

Deaths
June 1 – Jean Rousseau, viol player and composer (born 1644)
April 11 – Friedrich Christian Bressand, librettist (born 1670)
October 20 – Friedrich Funcke, composer (born 1642)
December 30 – Pierre Robert, composer (born c.1618)
December 31 – Andreas Armsdorff, composer and organistdate unknown''
Mario Agatea, singer, composer and instrument maker (born c.1623–28)
Isaac Blackwell, composer and organist
José Marín, composer (born 1619)
Charles Mouton, composer and lutenist (born 1617)
Pierre Robert, composer (born 1618)

References

 
17th century in music
Music by year